The GCR Class 9J (LNER Class J11) was a class of 174 0-6-0 steam locomotives designed by John G. Robinson for freight work on the Great Central Railway (GCR) in 1901. They were a part of the Railway Operating Division during World War 1.

Career

London and North Eastern Railway
They passed to the London and North Eastern Railway (LNER) in 1923. The LNER classified them as J11 with sub-classes J11/1 to J11/5 because of detail differences.

British Railways
The whole class survived into British Railways (BR) ownership in 1948 and their BR numbers were 64280–64453. All had been withdrawn and scrapped by 1962 and none have been preserved.

References

09J
0-6-0 locomotives
Railway locomotives introduced in 1901
Neilson Reid locomotives
Beyer, Peacock locomotives
Vulcan Foundry locomotives
YEC locomotives
Railway Operating Division locomotives
Scrapped locomotives
Freight locomotives
Standard gauge steam locomotives of Great Britain